Taphon is a genus of sea snails, marine gastropod molluscs in the family Melongenidae, the crown conches and their allies.

Species
 Taphon childsi Scali & Liverani, 2020
 Taphon clavella (Reeve, 1847)
Species brought into synonymy
 Taphon striatum (G. B. Sowerby I, 1833): synonym of Taphon clavella (Reeve, 1847)

References

External links
 Adams, H. & Adams, A. (1853-1858). The genera of Recent Mollusca; arranged according to their organization. London, van Voorst.

Melongenidae